South Korean singer Taeyeon has received multiple awards and nominations for her music work. She debuted in 2007 as a member of girl group Girls' Generation and initially achieved several awards and nominations for her early solo endeavors. In 2008, she won a Golden Disc Award in the Popularity category and a Cyworld Digital Music Award for Song of the Month with her OST song "If". She also earned two MBC Drama Awards and a Mnet 20's Choice Award for her radio show Taeyeon's Chin Chin Radio in 2009.

In 2015, Taeyeon debuted as a solo artist with her extended play I, from which the title track "I" earned her multiple awards and nominations, including a Gaon Chart Music Award for Song of the Year – October and a Golden Disc Award in the Digital category. Her success earned her Best Female Artist at both the Mnet Asian Music Awards in 2015 and Golden Disc Awards the following year. The title track "I" raked in a total of eleven trophies on five music programs.

In 2016, Taeyeon released her second extended play Why which yielded two singles, "Starlight" and "Why". She also released two digital singles, "Rain" and "11:11", and earned three trophies on music programs. "Rain" won a Golden Disc Award in the Digital category while Taeyeon herself won another Mnet Asian Music Award for Best Female Artist and a Melon Music Award for Top 10 Artists.

Taeyeon's first studio album, titled My Voice, was released in February 2017 and produced a lead single titled "Fine" which earned her two trophies on music programs. The album was well-received and earned multiple awards and nominations, including a Golden Disc Award in the Physical Category and a first nomination at the Korean Music Awards for Best Pop Album. In December 2017, Taeyeon released her first special extended play This Christmas: Winter Is Coming with title track "This Christmas". In 2018, she released her third extended play Something New.

In 2019, Taeyeon released a digital single "Four Seasons" which won the Digital Daesang (Grand Prize) at the 29th Seoul Music Awards and multiple other awards. In the same year, she released her debut Japanese extended play Voice and her second studio album Purpose which earned her a second nomination for Best Pop Album at the Korean Music Awards. She also released an OST song "All About You" which won Best OST at the Seoul Music Awards. Taeyeon herself earned a Bonsang at the Seoul Music Awards and another Melon Music Award for Top 10 Artists. Four Seasons and Purpose's lead single "Spark" earned her five trophies on music programs.

Awards and nominations

Other accolades

Listicles

See also 
List of awards and nominations received by Girls' Generation
List of awards and nominations received by Girls' Generation-TTS

References 

Awards
Taeyeon